Maksym Serhiyovych Lunyov (born 22 May 1998) is a Ukrainian professional footballer who currently plays as a left winger for Kryvbas Kryvyi Rih in the Ukrainian Premier League.

Club career

Early years
Lunyov is a product of Elektrometalurh-NZF Nikopol and Dnipro Dnipropetrovsk youth sportive school systems. His first coach at Dnipro was Ihor Khomenko.

Dnipro
He made his debut as a substituted player in a second half-time for Dnipro in the match against Volyn Lutsk on 24 July 2016 in the Ukrainian Premier League.

Zorya Luhansk
In 2017 he moved to Zorya Luhansk. On 2 January 2023 he left the club with mutual agreement.

Kryvbas Kryvyi Rih
On 5 January 2023 he moved to Kryvbas Kryvyi Rih.

Career statistics

References

External links
 
 

1998 births
Living people
People from Nikopol, Ukraine
Ukrainian footballers
Association football forwards
Ukraine youth international footballers
Ukraine under-21 international footballers
FC Dnipro players
FC Zorya Luhansk players
FC Kryvbas Kryvyi Rih players
Ukrainian Premier League players
Sportspeople from Dnipropetrovsk Oblast